Joan Valerie (born Helen Vlahakis; July 15, 1911 – January 30, 1983) was an American actress, who appeared mainly in B movies in the late 1930s and 1940s.

Early years
Born  in Sparta, Wisconsin, Valerie was the daughter of Michael Vlahakis.

She was a 1931 graduate of Rhinelander High School. She participated in local play productions in her hometown and was active in theatrical productions at Morningside College.

In 1932, Vlahakis was runner-up for the title of "Miss Wisconsin."

In 1934, Vlahakis was selected from a group of 44 women as Morningside College's "most beautiful girl," Miss Morningside.

Film
Valerie initially changed her name to "Helen Valkis" for acting purposes. She was discovered by Darryl F. Zanuck on stage at the Pasadena Playhouse.

In 1928, she was the leading lady in Yukon Trails, a Rex Pictures production that was filmed in Valerie's hometown, Rhinelander, Wisconsin, with an all-local cast.

Vlahakis's performance as the lead in Edward Elsner's Not So Long Ago in Hollywood led to two film studios' giving her screen tests, one of which resulted in a small part in Reckless (1935). After signing a contract (as Helen Valkis) with the Independent Productions film company in 1935, she received a contract from Warner Bros. in 1936. She played ingenues in two musical westerns with Dick Foran, and appeared in Confession, The Prince and the Pauper, Day-Time Wife, and Sergeant Murphy, among others.

Warners dropped her option after one year. In 1938 she freelanced, landing a role in a Gene Autry western and a lead in a low-budget animal adventure (for which she used the pseudonym Helen Hughes). That same year Twentieth Century-Fox chief Darryl F. Zanuck saw her in a play and offered her a contact. Under the new name Joan Valerie, she was featured in many of Fox's "A" and "B" pictures, including the Charlie Chan and Michael Shayne mysteries.

Fox curtailed most of its "B" productions in 1942 and released Joan Valerie. She accepted two assignments at RKO, and then withdrew from the screen temporarily. She resumed her movie career in 1947, freelancing again, and retired in 1953.

Personal life
She was married to Paris Methusis and, in 1940, to Grant Richards. She and Richards, with whom she had a daughter, Jo-Ellen Rose, were divorced September 9, 1942. A newspaper report said that Valerie "sued under her true name of Helen Jaffe." She also had a son, George.

Partial filmography

 Fighting Youth (1935) - Sorority Girl (uncredited)
 Ready, Willing, and Able (1937) - Switchboard Operator (uncredited)
 The Prince and the Pauper (1937) - Lady Jane Seymour
 The Cherokee Strip (1937) - Ruth Valley
 The Go Getter (1937) - Skinner's Secretary
 Blazing Sixes (1937) - Barbara Morgan
 Talent Scout (1937) - Ruth - Secretary
 Confession (1937) - Wanda
 It's Love I'm After (1937) - Autograph Seeker (uncredited)
 Alcatraz Island (1937) - Drake's Secretary (uncredited)
 Missing Witnesses (1937) - Simpering Girl (uncredited)
 Hollywood Hotel (1937) - Girl at Premiere (uncredited)
 Sergeant Murphy (1938) - Bess Merrill
 The Old Barn Dance (1938) - Sally Dawson
 Topa Topa (1938) - Margaret Weston
 A Trip to Paris (1938) - Marguerite Varloff
 Safety in Numbers (1938) - Toni Stewart (replaced by Iva Stewart) (uncredited)
 Submarine Patrol (1938) - Anne
 Road Demon (1938) - Joan Rogers
 Kentucky (1939) - Lucy Pemberton (uncredited)
 Tail Spin (1939) - Sunny
 Day-Time Wife (1939) - Mrs. Dexter
 The Man Who Wouldn't Talk (1940) - Miss Norton
 Young as You Feel (1940) - Bonnie Jones
 Free, Blonde and 21 (1940) - Vickie
 Lillian Russell (1940) - Lillian Russell's Sister
 Girl in 313 (1940) - Francine Edwards
 Pier 13 (1940) - Helen Kelly
 The Great Profile (1940) - Understudy
 Charlie Chan at the Wax Museum (1940) - Lily Latimer
 Murder Over New York (1940) - June Preston
 Michael Shayne, Private Detective (1940) - Marsha Gordon
 Jennie (1940) - Clara Schermer
 Who Is Hope Schuyler? (1942) - Phyllis Guerney
 Rio Rita (1942) - Dotty
 Just Off Broadway (1942) - Rita Darling
 Government Girl (1943) - Miss Jane MacVickers (uncredited)
 Around the World (1943) - Countess Olga (uncredited)
 Lost Honeymoon (1947) - Nurse (uncredited)
 The Hucksters (1947) - Receptionist (uncredited)
 Three Daring Daughters (1948) - Hostess (uncredited)
 Any Number Can Play (1949) - Minor Role (uncredited)
 The Skipper Surprised His Wife (1950) - Nurse (uncredited)
 A Life of Her Own (1950) - Party Guest (uncredited)
 Mister 880 (1950) - Cashier (uncredited)
 Roaring City (1951) - Irma Rand
 Father Takes the Air (1951) - Blonde
 Westward the Women (1951) - Flashy Woman (uncredited)
 The Girl in White (1952) - Nurse Hanson

References

External links 

 

American film actresses
1911 births
1983 deaths
American stage actresses
Actresses from Wisconsin
American people of Greek descent
People from Rhinelander, Wisconsin
20th-century American actresses
People from Sparta, Wisconsin
Morningside University alumni